U-34 (S184) is a  Type 212A submarine of the German Navy. She is the fourth ship of the class to enter service.

She was laid down in December 2001 by Howaldtswerke, Kiel, launched in July 2006 and commissioned on 3 May 2007. She is  under the patronage of the Bavarian town of Starnberg.

Service 
U-34 is currently part of the 1st Ubootgeschwader, based in Eckernförde.  She sailed from Eckernförde on 22 January 2009, bound for the Mediterranean to participate in the anti-terrorism mission Operation Active Endeavour. She was again deployed with Operation Active Endeavour in the south-eastern Mediterranean in May 2011. During this time she trialled the multi-crew concept, with three crews taking turns manning the submarine until her return to port on 11 December 2011. This was deemed a success, with the sailors' time commitment and the downtime of the boat significantly reduced.

On 25 May 2015 U-34 left Eckernförde and arrived at Tallinn on 30 May to join Standing NATO Maritime Group 2, taking part in exercises in the Baltic Sea as the group's 'Silent Partner'. In September she took part in multinational CASEX exercises in the Baltic, with surface ships of the German, Polish and Swedish navies. In October U-34 took part in Grüner Aal (Green Eel) manoeuvres, a series of torpedo training exercises with the Royal Norwegian Navy. On 30 March 2016 U-34 deployed from Eckernförde to the coast of Scotland, joining Standing NATO Maritime Group 1 and taking part in Exercise Joint Warrior, returning to her homeport in May.

References 

Type 212 submarines of the German Navy
Attack submarines
2006 ships
Submarines of Germany